Timeline of the COVID-19 pandemic in the United Kingdom may refer to:

By year

2020
 Timeline of the COVID-19 pandemic in the United Kingdom (January–June 2020)
 Timeline of the COVID-19 pandemic in the United Kingdom (July–December 2020)

2021
 Timeline of the COVID-19 pandemic in the United Kingdom (January–June 2021)
 Timeline of the COVID-19 pandemic in the United Kingdom (July–December 2021)

2022
 Timeline of the COVID-19 pandemic in the United Kingdom (January–June 2022)
 Timeline of the COVID-19 pandemic in the United Kingdom (July–December 2022)

2023
 Timeline of the COVID-19 pandemic in the United Kingdom (2023)

By country

England
Timeline of the COVID-19 pandemic in England (January–June 2020)
Timeline of the COVID-19 pandemic in England (July–December 2020)
Timeline of the COVID-19 pandemic in England (2021)
Timeline of the COVID-19 pandemic in England (2022)

Northern Ireland
Timeline of the COVID-19 pandemic in Northern Ireland (2020)
Timeline of the COVID-19 pandemic in Northern Ireland (2021)
Timeline of the COVID-19 pandemic in Northern Ireland (2022)

Scotland
Timeline of the COVID-19 pandemic in Scotland (2020)
Timeline of the COVID-19 pandemic in Scotland (2021)
Timeline of the COVID-19 pandemic in Scotland (2022)

Wales
Timeline of the COVID-19 pandemic in Wales (2020)
Timeline of the COVID-19 pandemic in Wales (2021)
Timeline of the COVID-19 pandemic in Wales (2022)

See also
History of the COVID-19 pandemic in the United Kingdom

 
United Kingdom